The Aero A.21 was a biplane military trainer aircraft developed in Czechoslovakia from the Aero A.11 reconnaissance-bomber. The aircraft was developed specifically as a night-trainer, to teach Czech Air Force pilots instrument flying techniques.

Specifications (A.21)

Operators
 Czechoslovakia.

See also

Citations

Bibliography

A021
Biplanes
Single-engined tractor aircraft
1920s Czechoslovakian military trainer aircraft